Manuel José Fernández (born 10 June 1927) is an Argentine former sports shooter. He competed in the 25 metre pistol event at the 1964 Summer Olympics.

References

External links
  

1927 births
Possibly living people
Argentine male sport shooters
Olympic shooters of Argentina
Shooters at the 1964 Summer Olympics
Place of birth missing (living people)